Tom Corbett, Space Cadet is a TV series that aired 1950–1955, depicting the fictional character Tom Corbett. Episodes were 15 minutes (weekdays) and 30 minutes (Saturdays).

Origin 
The initial concept for the series followed the scripts by Joseph Greene originally proposed  as a comic strip in 1945, and then as a proposed radio serial in 1946, titled Space CadetsTom Ranger, Space Cadet, and 1947, titled "Space Academy".

Following the publication of Robert A. Heinlein's young-adult novel Space Cadet in 1948, Rockhill Studios licensed the “Space Cadet” name from Heinlein in 1950 for the series then in development.

The Mercurian Invasion
The initial installment of the series was edited into the 88 minute long The Mercurian Invasion which was released in 1998.

Cast 
 Tom Corbett – Frankie Thomas Jr.
 Astro – Al Markim: A Venusian cadet
 Roger Manning – Jan Merlin: A smug, egotistical cadet with an inordinately high opinion of his own abilities, although he occasionally proved himself to be nearly as skilled as he imagined himself to be. Roger occasionally made condescending, racist remarks about Astro but gradually came to like and respect the Venusian, although he sometimes maintained his bigoted attitude as a distancing mechanism (October 1950-May 1954).
 Captain Steve Strong – Edward Bryce
 Dr. Joan Dale – Margaret Garland
 Commander Arkwright – Carter Blake
 Cadet Alfie Higgins – John Fiedler
 Cadet Eric Rattison – Frank Sutton
 Cadet T. J. Thistle – Jack Grimes (December 1954-June 1955)
Michael Harvey played Captain Strong for the first six episodes of the CBS series; Pat Ferris played Dr. Dale for two episodes of the DuMont series.

Crew 
 Technical Advisor – Willy Ley
 Writers: Albert Aley, Stu Byrnes, Frankie Thomas Jr., Ray Morse, Jack Weinstock, Willy Gilbert, Alfred Bester & others.
 Space Cadet Hats: Major Sportswear supplied tinsulated, aluminized hats with logos.

Distribution 
Tom Corbett is one of only six TV series to appear on all four networks of the time, along with The Arthur Murray Party, Down You Go, The Ernie Kovacs Show, Pantomime Quiz, and The Original Amateur Hour:

 CBS from October 2 to December 1950
 ABC from January 1951 to September 1952
 NBC from July to September 1951
 DuMont from August 1953 to May 1954 
 NBC again from December 1954 to June 1955, with the final broadcast on June 25, 1955.

Image gallery

References

External links 
 
 Solar Guard (Tom Corbett, Space Cadet fan page).

1950 American television series debuts
1955 American television series endings
English-language television shows
Space adventure television series
Television series set on fictional planets
Television series set in the future
Television shows based on comic strips